Habib Bâ is a Senegalese former football player and manager.

Playing career
Bâ began his career in his native Senegal, playing for US Gorée. On 8 May 1955, he scored in a 7–0 win against ASEC Mimosas in the 1955 French West African Cup final. Bâ later moved to Europe, signing for Monaco.

Managerial career
After his playing career, Bâ returned to Senegal to manage US Gorée. During the mid-1960s, whilst still managing US Gorée, Bâ managed Senegal alongside Lybasse Diop. Under Bâ's management, in their first appearance at the tournament, Senegal finished fourth at the 1965 African Cup of Nations.

References

Date of birth missing
Year of birth missing
Possibly living people
Senegalese footballers
US Gorée players
AS Monaco FC players
1965 African Cup of Nations managers
Senegal national football team managers
Senegalese football managers
Senegalese expatriate footballers
Senegalese expatriate sportspeople in France
Expatriate footballers in France
Association footballers not categorized by position